Kaguya-sama: Love Is War is a Japanese manga series written and illustrated by Aka Akasaka. Akasaka launched the series in the June issue of Shueisha's seinen manga magazine Miracle Jump on May 19, 2015. The series switched to the publisher's Weekly Young Jump magazine on March 24, 2016.  A special chapter ran in the debut issue of Young Jump Gold on May 18, 2017.  North American publisher Viz Media announced their license to the series during their panel at San Diego Comic-Con International on July 20, 2017.

A spinoff manga by Shinta Sakayama, titled , launched on Shueisha's Tonari no Young Jump website on June 14, 2018, and is serialized on the second and fourth Thursdays of the month.  A yonkoma spinoff, written by G3 Ida and titled ,  launched in Young Jump on July 26, 2018. The yonkoma focuses on two newspaper/press club girls who idolize Kaguya and the gang but have no clue what really goes on inside the student council.

Individual chapters of the series are called battles.


Volumes list

References

Kaguya-sama: Love Is War
Kaguya-sama: Love Is War